William De Stanwey (sometimes recorded as Mgr William de stanwey) was Dean of Exeter between 1231 and 1252.

Notes

13th-century English Roman Catholic priests
1268 deaths
Deans of Exeter
Year of birth unknown